"Chantilly Lace" is a 1958 rock and roll song by The Big Bopper. It was produced by Jerry Kennedy, and reached No. 6 on the US Billboard Hot 100. The song was also covered by Jerry Lee Lewis in 1972.

History 
Originally cut for Pappy Daily's D label, the recording was purchased by Mercury Records and reissued in the summer of 1958, just over six months after Chuck Berry released "Sweet Little Sixteen", which uses the same chord progression. The song was originally released as the flip side to "The Purple People Eater Meets The Witch Doctor", which parodied "The Purple People Eater" by Sheb Wooley and "Witch Doctor" by David Seville. The was J.P. Richardson's first release under the moniker The Big Bopper. However, DJs and the public preferred the flip side "Chantilly Lace", and it was this song that became a hit.

The song reached No. 6 on the Billboard Hot 100 and spent 22 weeks on the national Top 40. It was the third most played song of 1958.  On the Cash Box chart, "Chantilly Lace" reached No. 4.

Lyrics 
The song depicts a young man flirting with his girlfriend on the telephone and listing things about her that he likes, including:
Chantilly lace and a pretty face
And a pony tail hangin' down
A wiggle in her walk and a giggle in her talk
Make the world go 'round.

Charts

Jerry Lee Lewis version 

In January 1972, Jerry Lee Lewis recorded a version of "Chantilly Lace" at the Mercury studio in Nashville. The recording was done with everyone (10 musicians and 6 backing singers) crowded into the studio as Lewis did not want any overdubbing on the record. The single (with B-side "Think About It Darlin'") was released 6 weeks after it was recorded.  It was for three weeks a No. 1 hit on the Billboard Hot Country Singles chart and a top fifty pop hit in the US and a Top 40 pop hit in the UK. The song was included in the album The Killer Rocks On

Charts

In popular culture
The song inspired an answer song titled "That Makes It", recorded by actress Jayne Mansfield in 1964, and released as the B-side to "Little Things Mean A Lot".  Mansfield performed the song in the 1966 film The Las Vegas Hillbillys.

References 

1958 songs
1958 debut singles
1972 singles
The Big Bopper songs
Jerry Lee Lewis songs
Mitch Ryder songs
Mercury Records singles
Novelty songs
Shorty Long songs
Song recordings produced by Jerry Kennedy
Songs about telephone calls
Songs written by the Big Bopper